Messaoud Bouardja (born 6 July 1991) is a French professional footballer who plays for Feignies Aulnoye FC as an attacking midfielder. Between 2016 and 2018 Bouardja played for Chamois Niortais, where he made 14 appearances in Ligue 2, the second-highest division of French football. He also previously played amateur football with Croix and Wasquehal. Bouardja is of Algerian descent.

Career statistics

Honours
Wasquehal
 Championnat de France amateur 2 Group D winners: 2014–15

References

1991 births
Living people
Footballers from Lille
French footballers
French sportspeople of Algerian descent
Association football midfielders
Wasquehal Football players
Chamois Niortais F.C. players
Entente Feignies Aulnoye FC players
Ligue 2 players